Jarrahwood is a small town located in the South West region of Western Australia, near the Vasse Highway between Busselton and Nannup. At the 2021 census, the area had a population of nine.

History
The town is named for the Jarrah Wood and Saw Mills Company which operated in the area and operated a private railway from the district to Wonnerup, which was purchased by the Government in 1906. It was gazetted in 1932. The town lost much of its population after the closure of the local mill in 1982. A newspaper report from around this time described the town as containing "two schools, a hospital, a sizeable town hall, a number of diverse shops, a post office and about 50 company cottages".

Climate
Jarrahwood experiences a Mediterranean climate (Köppen climate classification Csb) with warm-to-hot summers and cool winters. It generally receives more rainfall and cooler minimum temperatures than Busselton.

References

Towns in Western Australia
South West (Western Australia)
Timber towns in Western Australia